Phillip Burlette Bedgood (March 8, 1898 – November 8, 1927) pitched two years of major league baseball for the Cleveland Indians, in 1922 and 1923. He played his first game on September 20, 1922, and his last game on September 15, 1923.

Bedgood pitched 27 innings in his career. Bedgood died at the early age of 29 when his appendix burst while being treated for a strained muscle in his side.

References

External links

1898 births
1927 deaths
Baseball players from Georgia (U.S. state)
Cleveland Indians players
Major League Baseball pitchers